Colasposoma viridivittatum is a species of leaf beetle of Mali, described by Joseph Sugar Baly in 1865.

References

viridivittatum
Beetles of Africa
Taxa named by Joseph Sugar Baly
Insects of West Africa
Beetles described in 1865